The Lajeado Grande River is a river in the state of Rio Grande do Sul, Brazil.  The river empties into the Das Antas River, the upper reaches of the Taquari River.

See also
List of rivers of Rio Grande do Sul

References

Rivers of Rio Grande do Sul